Tehsils are third-order administrative divisions of Azad Kashmir, after divisions and districts. Tehsils are divided into fourth-order administrative divisions known as union councils. The following is a list of all of the tehsils of Azad Kashmir.

Mirpur Division

Kotli District
 Kotli Tehsil
 Khuiratta Tehsil
 Fatehpur Thakiala Tehsil
 Sehnsa Tehsil
 Charhoi Tehsil
 Duliah Jattan Tehsil

Mirpur District
 Dadyal Tehsil
 Mirpur Tehsil
 Islamgarh Tehsil

Bhimber District
 Bhimber Tehsil
 Barnala Tehsil
 Samahni Tehsil

Muzaffarabad Division

Hattian Bala District
 Hattian Bala Tehsil
 Chikkar Tehsil
 Leepa Tehsil

Muzaffarabad District
 Muzaffarabad Tehsil
 Nasirabad Tehsil

Neelum District
 Athmuqam Tehsil
 Sharda Tehsil

Poonch Division

Bagh District
 Bagh Tehsil
 Dhirkot Tehsil
 Hari Ghel Tehsil
 Rera Tehsil
 Birpani Tehsil

Haveli District
 Haveli Tehsil
 Khurshidabad Tehsil
 Mumtazabad Tehsil

Poonch District
 Abbaspur Tehsil
 Hajira Tehsil
 Rawalakot Tehsil
 Thorar Tehsil

Sudhnoti District
 Balouch Tehsil
 Mang Tehsil
 Pallandri Tehsil
 Tarar Khel Tehsil

References

 
Geography of Azad Kashmir